Federal Man is a 1950 American crime film directed by Robert Emmett Tansey and starring William Henry, Pamela Blake and Robert Shayne.

Plot

Cast
William Henry as Phil Sherrin
Pamela Blake as Judith Palmer
Robert Shanye as Charles Stuart
Lyle Talbot as Agent Johnson
Movita as Lolita
Lori Irving as Betty Herbert
John Laurenz as Rodriguez
Ben Moselle as Mack
George Eldredge as Wade Brandon
Dennis Moore as Harry

References

Bibliography
 Hardy, Phil. The BFI Companion to Crime. A&C Black, 1997.

External links

1950s English-language films
1950 crime drama films
Eagle-Lion Films films
1950 films
American crime drama films
Films directed by Robert Emmett Tansey
American black-and-white films
1950s American films